Matthias Nölke (born 8 January 1980) is a German jurist and politician of the Free Democratic Party (FDP) who served as a member of the Bundestag from the state of Hesse from 2020 to 2021.

Political career 
Nölke became a member of the Bundestag in 2020 when he replaced Stefan Ruppert who had resigned. In parliament, he served on the Committee on Labour and Social Affairs.

In addition to his committee assignments, Nölke served as deputy chairman of the Parliamentary Friendship Group for Relations with the Baltic States from 2020 to 2021.

References

External links 
 

 

 

1980 births
Living people
Politicians from Kassel
Members of the Bundestag for Hesse
Members of the Bundestag 2017–2021
Free Democratic Party (Germany) politicians